The Embassy of Zimbabwe in Washington, D.C. is the Zimbabwe's diplomatic mission to the United States. It is located at 1608 New Hampshire Avenue, Northwest, Washington, D.C., in the Dupont Circle neighborhood.

Tadeous Tafirenyika Chifamba was appointed ambassador to the US in October 2020 by Zimbabwe's president Emmerson Mnangagwa.

Building
Constructed in 1917, the former private residence (past owners include Frederick Albion Ober-) was purchased by the Zimbabwe government in 1990 (previous occupant was the Institute for Soviet-American Relations). It is a contributing property to the Dupont Circle Historic District, and valued at $6,088,460.

See also
 List of ambassadors of Zimbabwe to the United States
 List of diplomatic missions of Zimbabwe

References

External links

Zimbabwe
Washington, D.C.
United States–Zimbabwe relations
Dupont Circle